CHLT-DT, virtual and VHF digital channel 7, is a TVA owned-and-operated television station licensed to Sherbrooke, Quebec, Canada. The station is owned by the Groupe TVA subsidiary of Quebecor Media. CHLT-DT's studios are located on Rue King Ouest (near Route 112) in Sherbrooke, and its transmitter is located in Orford. This station can also be seen on Vidéotron channel 4 and in high definition on digital channel 604.

History
The station went on the air for the first time on August 12, 1956. It was owned by La Tribune, the city's major newspaper, along with CHLT radio. Like most television stations in Quebec, it was a dual affiliate of both CBC and Radio-Canada. It usually went on the air sooner than other Quebec stations, forcing it to fill the schedule with local shows. La Tribune was eventually acquired by Power Corporation of Canada, which sold CHLT to Telemedia in 1968.

When CKSH-TV went on the air on September 19, 1974, it took all Radio-Canada programming away from CHLT. Sherbrooke's anglophone population was too small for CHLT to be viable as a privately owned CBC Television affiliate. As a result, it joined TVA that same day after CBMT in Montreal opened a translator in Sherbrooke. Five years later, Pathonic Communications acquired CHLT and four other stations from Telemedia, forming a network which from 1986–1990 was branded as Réseau Pathonic.

Pathonic's stations often aired a schedule different from that offered on TVA flagship station CFTM-TV in Montreal. As a result, since CHLT's over-the-air signal reaches Montreal, it was also carried on CF Cable and Vidéotron's Montreal-area systems. For most of the late 1980s, CHLT claimed Montreal as part of its primary coverage area, even though Télé-Metropole, owner of CFTM, held a minority stake in Réseau Pathonic. However, in 1990, Télé-Metropole bought Pathonic and took full control of TVA. Since then, CHLT has basically functioned as a semi-satellite of CFTM, except for newscasts and commercials. CF Cable stopped carrying CHLT in the early 1990s, and Vidéotron followed suit in 1995.

During the analogue era, CHLT was one of TVA's most powerful stations; its terrestrial footprint extended as far as northwestern Maine. Also, as with CKSH-DT, CHLT enjoys cable coverage throughout selected areas of Northern New England, as far east as Augusta and Rockland, Maine.

References

External links

HLT
HLT
Television channels and stations established in 1956
1956 establishments in Quebec